Melaleuca gibbosa, commonly known as the slender honey-myrtle or small-leaved honey-myrtle is a plant in the myrtle family, Myrtaceae and is endemic to southern Australia.

Description
The leaves are sessile and arranged in crowded, alternating, opposite pairs along the stem (decussate).

Flowers appear mainly in November to December but often appear at other times of the year. The seeds are retained in the capsules until the plant, or that part of it, dies.

Taxonomy and naming
Melaleuca gibbosa was first formally described in 1806 by the French biologist, Jacques Labillardière in Novae Hollandiae Plantarum Specimen. The specific epithet (gibbosa) from the Latin gibbosus, meaning "gibbous" or more swollen in one place than another, referring to the sunken fruits making the stems appear lumpy.

Distribution and habitat
Slender honey-myrtle occurs along the coasts of South Australia, Victoria and Tasmania as well as on Kangaroo Island and Flinders Island. It grows vigorously in exposed positions such as  Cape Bruny at the southern tip of  Bruny Island and Hurricane Heath on the Tasman Peninsula.

Ecology
This species of melaleuca provides food for some species of caterpillar, including those of the tactile tuft-moth, Aquita tactalis (Walker, 1863).

Uses
In cultivation, M. gibbosa is a very hardy plant, suited to most soils and aspects. It is drought hardy, frost tolerant and tolerates waterlogging. It can be propagated easily from seed collected from capsules one or two years old, or from semi-hard wood cuttings.

References

bracteata
Myrtales of Australia
Flora of Victoria (Australia)
Flora of South Australia
Flora of Tasmania
Garden plants of Australia
Plants described in 1806